Clark County Courthouse may refer to:

 Clark County Courthouse (Arkansas), Arkadelphia, Arkansas
 Clark County Courthouse (Kansas), Ashland, Kansas
 Clark County Court House (Kentucky), Winchester, Kentucky
 Clark County Courthouse (Missouri), Kahoka, Missouri
 Clark County Courthouse (Ohio), Springfield, Ohio
 Clark County Courthouse (South Dakota), Clark, South Dakota
 Clark County Courthouse (Washington), Vancouver, Washington, listed on the National Register of Historic Places

See also 
 Clarke County Courthouse (disambiguation)